The Philippines women's national rugby union team, nicknamed the Lady Volcanoes. They played their first fifteens rugby in non-test matches in a developmental tournament involving Laos and Thailand. Their first test match was against China at the 2011 Asian Division II Championship. They hosted the 2012 Asian Division II Championship in Manila.

They went on a hiatus from full 11-a-side rugby until 2018, when they competed in the Division I Asian Championships.

Results summary
(Full internationals only)

Results

Full internationals

References

External links
 Philippine Rugby Football Union official website
 Philippines at IRB.com
 Philippines national team at RugbyInAsia.com
 Manila 10s the social Rugby tournament that has promoted Rugby Union in the Philippines

Rugby union in the Philippines
Asian national women's rugby union teams
W
Women's national rugby union teams